The international status and usage of the euro has grown since its launch in 1999. When the euro formally replaced 12 currencies on 1 January 2002, it inherited their use in territories such as Montenegro and replaced minor currencies tied to the pre-euro currencies, such as in Monaco. Four small states have been given a formal right to use the euro, and to mint their own coins, but all other usage outside the eurozone (the EU states who have adopted the euro) has been unofficial. With or without an agreement, these countries, unlike those in the eurozone, do not participate in the European Central Bank or the Eurogroup.

Its international usage has also grown as a trading currency, acting as an economic or political alternative to using the United States dollar. Its increasing usage in this sense has led to its becoming the only significant challenger to the U.S. dollar as the world's main reserve currency.

International adoption

Sovereign states

Several European microstates outside the EU have adopted the euro as their currency. For EU sanctioning of this adoption, a monetary agreement must be concluded. Prior to the launch of the euro, agreements were reached with Monaco, San Marino, and Vatican City by EU member states (Italy in the case of San Marino and Vatican City, and France in the case of Monaco) allowing them to use the euro and mint a limited amount of euro coins (with their own national symbols on the obverse side) to be valid throughout the Eurozone. However, they cannot print banknotes. All of these states had previously had monetary agreements to use yielded eurozone currencies. San Marino and Vatican City had their currencies pegged to the Italian lira (Vatican and Sammarinese lira) and Monaco used the Monegasque franc, which was pegged to the French franc. Between 2010 and 2012, new agreements between the EU and Monaco, San Marino, and the Vatican City came into force.

A similar agreement was negotiated with Andorra and came into force on 1 April 2012. Andorra did not previously have an official currency.  Prior to 2002, it used both the French franc and Spanish peseta as de facto legal tender currencies, though they never had an official monetary arrangement with either country, and switched to the euro (without any monetary agreement) when it was introduced on 1 January 2002. After years of negotiations, partially over concerns with banking secrecy, the EU and Andorra signed a monetary agreement on 30 June 2011 which made the euro the official currency in Andorra and allowed them to mint their own euro coins as early as 1 July 2013, provided they comply with the agreement's terms. However, the first Andorran euro coins did not enter into circulation until January 2015.

Dependent territories outside the EU

Outside the EU, there are currently three French territories and a British territory that have agreements to use the euro as their currency. All other dependent territories of eurozone member states that have opted not to be a part of EU, usually with Overseas Country and Territory (OCT) status, use local currencies which are often pegged to the euro or US dollar. As non-sovereign entities, dependent territories which have adopted the euro are not permitted to mint euro coins like the European microstates, nor do they get a seat in the European Central Bank (ECB) or the Eurogroup. France is responsible for ensuring that the laws governing the EMU apply in their territories which use the euro.

The first OCTs to adopt the euro through a monetary agreement were the French overseas territories of Saint-Pierre-et-Miquelon, located off the coast of Canada, and Mayotte in the Indian Ocean. They both adopted the euro on 1 January 1999 when the currency was first introduced at the electronic level. Mayotte subsequently held a referendum in 2009 in which it decided to become an integral part of France. Its status was changed from an OCT to an OMR, where EU laws apply without separate agreements, on 1 January 2014, which rendered the previous monetary agreement unnecessary.

On 22 February 2007, Saint Barthélemy and Saint Martin were politically separated from the French Outermost region (OMR) Guadeloupe to form two new French overseas collectivities. This caused their status in the EU to briefly be in legal limbo until ratification of the Treaty of Lisbon reaffirmed both territories remained in the EU. The euro continued to be used in both territories throughout this time without incident. When Saint Barthélemy subsequently became an overseas territory of the European Union on 1 January 2012, changing its status to an OCT, the territory had to sign a monetary agreement to continue using the euro.

With the adoption of the euro by Cyprus per 1 January 2008, the Sovereign Base Areas of Akrotiri and Dhekelia, which had previously used the Cypriot pound, also decided to adopt the euro. The base areas are an overseas territory of the United Kingdom and under military jurisdiction. Even when the UK was an EU member state, the base areas were not considered part of the EU. The euro was instead adopted to align the base areas with the laws and currency of the Republic of Cyprus.

Unilateral adopters

Montenegro and Kosovo have also used the euro since its launch, as they previously used the German mark rather than the Yugoslav dinar. Unlike the states above, they do not have a formal agreement with the EU to use the euro as their currency, and have never minted marks or euros; rather, they depend on bills and coins already in circulation.

There were political concerns that Serbia could use the currency to destabilise these territories (Montenegro was then in a union with Serbia) so they received Western help in adopting and using the mark (though there was no restriction on the use of the dinar or any other currency). They switched to the euro when the mark was replaced. In North Kosovo, which is mainly populated by the Serbian minority, the Serbian dinar, which replaced the Yugoslav dinar, continues to be used despite its lack of recognition or use elsewhere in Kosovo.

The use of the euro in Montenegro and Kosovo has helped stabilise their economies, and for this reason the adoption of the euro by small states has been encouraged by former Finance Commissioner Joaquín Almunia. Former European Central Bank president Jean-Claude Trichet has stated the ECB – which does not grant representation to those who unilaterally adopt the euro – neither supports nor deters those wishing to use the currency.

In October 2012, the President of Panama Ricardo Martinelli suggested that he was considering making the euro a third official currency of the country to go along with the US dollar and the Panamanian balboa.

Usage in states with another official currency
In various countries the euro is accepted by some merchants albeit not being official currency there. Additionally sometimes it is used for pricing purposes even if the actual payments are made in the official currency (e.g., for real estate).

EU members outside the Eurozone
The euro is often accepted in shops in countries neighboring the Eurozone, like the borders areas and capitals of Poland, the Czech Republic and Hungary, which are near to Germany, Austria, Slovenia or Slovakia, the border areas in Switzerland, which is entirely surrounded by Eurozone members, the border areas in Sweden to Finland, and more.

Also, a large number of petrol stations and motorway service areas in European countries outside the eurozone accept euros, Poland (as well as non-EU members Bosnia and Herzegovina and Serbia) allow payment of highway tolls in euros.

The euro is explicitly present in some elements of the laws of these countries, as well as EEA countries, based on EU directives, for example money laundering. The laws can for example mention certain amounts in euro above which certain rules apply.

In some areas of New Caledonia and French Polynesia, both non-EU territories of an EU member state (France), payments in Euro can be accepted, alongside the territorial CFP Franc.

United Kingdom
Some tourist-oriented shops in the United Kingdom accept the euro. In Northern Ireland, which shares a land border with the Eurozone, the euro is accepted in some shops including many chain stores.

Northern Cyprus
The application of EU law and treaties to Northern Cyprus is currently suspended. Its territory is claimed by the Republic of Cyprus, one of the EU member states, but currently northern Cyprus is under Turkish Republic of Northern Cyprus (TRNC) control. The TRNC is not recognised by the Republic of Cyprus (which claims jurisdiction over the whole island), by the European Union or by any country other than Turkey. EU law would start to apply in Northern Cyprus if it comes under control of the Republic of Cyprus (if the Cyprus dispute is resolved through unification), whose official legal tender is the euro.

Presently, the TRNC government has declared the Turkish lira to be its legal tender. The euro (along with other major currencies, such as the US dollar and the British pound) can be used to pay for goods and services in many shops related to or situated near tourist hotspots, as well as in some major supermarkets. However the exchange rate used by these businesses may not always reflect the true value of the currencies involved. The Cypriot euro coins, using both Greek and Turkish languages, have been designed to avoid any bias towards any particular area of the island, in keeping with both Greek and Turkish being the official languages of the Republic of Cyprus. Some in northern Cyprus have called for the unilateral adoption of the euro.

Zimbabwe
From April 2009 to June 2019, the Zimbabwean dollar was no longer in active use after it was officially suspended by the government due to hyperinflation. The United States dollar (US$), South African rand (R), Botswanan pula (P), Pound sterling (£), Euro (€), Indian rupees (₹), Australian dollars (A$), Chinese yuan (元/¥), and Japanese yen (¥) were used instead, along with US-cent denominated Zimbabwean bond coins and bond notes.

Trading currency
In 1998, Cuba announced that it would replace the US dollar with the euro as its official currency for the purposes of international trading. On 1 December 2002, North Korea did the same. (Its internal currency, the wŏn, is not convertible and thus cannot be used to purchase foreign goods. The euro also enjoys popularity domestically, especially among elites and resident foreigners.) Syria followed suit in 2006.

Since 2007 Iran has asked all petroleum customers to pay in non-US-dollar currency in response to American sanctions. This has resulted in the Iranian oil bourse trading in several currencies, predominantly the euro for European trade and either the yen or euros for sales in Asia.

In 2018, in response to US sanctions, the Venezuelan Minister of Industries and National Production Tareck El Aissami announced that all foreign exchange government auctions will no longer be quoted in US dollars and would use euros, Chinese yuan and other hard currencies instead. El Aissami said the government would open bank accounts in Europe and Asia as potential workarounds to financial sanctions. In addition, Venezuela's banking sector will now be able to participate in currency auctions three times a week, adding that the government would sell some 2 billion euros amid a rebound in oil prices.

Pegged currencies
Currently, there are several currencies pegged to the euro, some with fluctuation bands around a central rate and others with no fluctuations allowed around the central rate. This can be seen as a safety measure, especially for currencies of areas with weak economies. The euro is seen as a stable currency, i.e., there are no dramatic appreciations or depreciations of its value that might suddenly damage the economy or harm trade. Thus it provides security to traders and people holding that currency.

In 2011, the Swiss franc was rapidly appreciating against the euro, harming its exports to the eurozone. In response, Switzerland implemented a cap to the Swiss franc's value. This was not so much a peg, as they were merely limiting its highest value and not its lowest.

The Bulgarian lev is pegged to the euro through a currency board. As part of ERM II, the currencies have a fluctuation band of ±15%. Denmark, however, has committed to a tighter fluctuation band of 2.25%.

Convertible mark is the currency of Bosnia and Herzegovina and it was fixed to 1 German mark when it was introduced on the basis of the Dayton agreement; consequently after introduction of the euro, the Convertible mark uses the German-mark-to-euro rate at 1.95583 BAM per euro.

Since 2005, stamps issued by the Sovereign Military Order of Malta have been denominated in euros, although the Order's official currency remains the Maltese scudo. The Maltese scudo itself is pegged to the euro and is only recognised as legal tender within the Order.

Reserve currency status

The euro is a major global reserve currency, the second most widely held international reserve currency after the US dollar. Inheriting this status from the German mark, its share of international reserves has risen from 23.65% in 2002 to a peak of 27.66% in 2009 before declining due to the European debt crisis, with Russia and Eastern Europe being the most significant users.

The possibility of the euro becoming the first international reserve currency was widely discussed before 2009.
Former Federal Reserve Chairman Alan Greenspan gave his opinion in September 2007 that the euro could indeed replace the US dollar as the world's primary reserve currency. He said it is "absolutely conceivable that the euro will replace the dollar as reserve currency, or will be traded as an equally important reserve currency."

As of 2021, however, the euro has not displaced the U.S. dollar as primary reserve currency due to the European debt crisis. The euro's stability and future existence was doubted and its share of global reserves fell to 19% by year-end 2015 (compared to 66% for the US dollar). As of year-end 2020 these figures stand at 21% for the euro and 59% for the US dollar.

See also

 Dollarisation
 International use of the US dollar
 Internationalization of the renminbi
 Central banks and currencies of Africa
 Central banks and currencies of the Caribbean
 Reserve currency

Notes

References

External links
ECB latest press release on central rates and bands for ERM II

Currencies of Zimbabwe
Euro
Monetary hegemony
Monetary policy of the European Union